Deck13 Interactive GmbH (formerly TriggerLab GmbH) is a German video game developer and publisher based in Frankfurt. The company was founded in July 2001 by the team behind Artex Software, a studio that primarily developed video games for RISC OS, such as Ankh: The Tales of Mystery. Originally bearing the name TriggerLab, the company was renamed to Deck13 after the release of its first game, Stealth Combat, in 2002. Deck13 is best known for developing the action role-playing games Lords of the Fallen and The Surge. Deck13 also operates a Hamburg-based subsidiary studio, Deck13 Hamburg.

History 
Deck13 is the successor to Artex Software, a development team that created the game Ankh for RISC OS. The company was founded as TriggerLab in 2001 by Jan Klose and Florian Stadlbauer. TriggerLab developed Stealth Combat, which was first released in Germany on 25 February 2002; shortly thereafter, on 2 April 2002, the company was renamed as Deck13 Interactive. The name "Deck13" was derived from "DM-Deck16", a game map from Unreal Tournament (1999). 

In 2005, the humorous adventure game Ankh was released, which was a remake of the 1997 game Ankh: The Tales of Mystery by Artex Software. As the product sold very well and won several awards (especially in Germany), the sequel Ankh: Heart of Osiris was produced and released almost exactly one year later, reusing elements of the previous title. In August 2007, the adventure game Jack Keane was released which was similar to the Ankh series in terms of graphics and gameplay but which was set in England and colonial India. The third part of the Ankh series, The Battle of the Gods, was released in Germany on 19 November 2007. One of their latest games, the role-playing game called Venetica was released in September 2009 and was the first RPG to be published by the company. Afterwards, Deck13 Interactive was working on Blood Knights, a comic hack-and-slash for Microsoft Windows, Xbox 360 and PlayStation 3, which was released in 2013.

In 2015, Deck13 released Lords of the Fallen in co-operation CI Games. While a sequel was announced by the publisher, Deck13 was not named as the developer. Instead, the studio was announced to be working with Focus Home Interactive on the then-upcoming The Surge. In September 2016, managing director Florian Stadlbauer announced that he had left the company and had since replaced by Mathias Reichert.

In June 2020, Focus Home Interactive acquired the company for €7.1 million.

In February 2021, Deck13 opened a development studio in Montreal.

Games developed

Cancelled 
 The Mystery of the Seven Symbols
 Jade Rousseau: Die Geheimen Evangelien – Episode 2: Die Bruderschaft
 Jade Rousseau: Die Geheimen Evangelien – Episode 3: Das geheime Dossier
 Jade Rousseau: Die Geheimen Evangelien – Episode 4: Der Weg in die Finsternis
 Jade Rousseau: Die Geheimen Evangelien – Episode 5: Die Geister der Vergangenheit
 Jade Rousseau: Die Geheimen Evangelien – Episode 6: Der Zorn Gottes

Games published

See also
Daedalic Entertainment – German adventure game developer
House of Tales – German adventure game developer
King Art Games – German adventure game developer

References

External links 
 

Companies based in Frankfurt
Focus Entertainment
German companies established in 2001
Video game companies established in 2001
Video game companies of Germany
Video game development companies
Video game publishers
2020 mergers and acquisitions